Calvert Extra is a Blended whiskey produced in Clermont, Kentucky and owned by Luxco which is headquartered in St. Louis, Missouri.

Calvert Extra is frequently referred to as Cocktail Whiskey because of its neutral spirit content. It is made from 70% grain neutral spirits and 30% straight whiskey. The high neutral spirit level makes it very unassuming so that it can be blended with any mixer and not overwhelm the cocktail. It is one of America's top selling blended whiskies. It is bottled at 80 proof (40% ABV). It is sold in glass in 16 oz pint bottles, glass 750 mL bottles, glass 1-liter bottles and plastic 1.75 L bottles.

References

External links
  official website

Whiskies of the United States
Alcoholic drink brands
Bullitt County, Kentucky
Kentucky cuisine